Podlugovi (Serbian Cyrillic: Подлугови) is a village in the municipality of Ilijaš, Bosnia and Herzegovina.

The village is known in former Yugoslavia thanks to Zdravko Čolić's song Stanica Podlugovi from 1983.

Demographics 
According to the 2013 census, its population was 1,228.

References

Populated places in Ilijaš